Mathias Dru Nkwenti (born May 11, 1978) is a former American football offensive tackle in the National Football League (NFL). He was drafted by the Pittsburgh Steelers in the fourth round of the 2001 NFL Draft and played in two games for them, once in 2001 and again in 2003. He went to Thomas S. Wootton High School in Rockville, Maryland and He played college football for the Temple University.

References

1978 births
Living people
Cameroonian players of American football
American football offensive tackles
Marshall Thundering Herd football players
Temple Owls football players
Pittsburgh Steelers players
People from Rockville, Maryland